Nazrul Islam ( – 28 October 2012) was a Bangladeshi politician from Bhola belonging to Bangladesh Awami League. He was elected twice as a member of the Jatiya Sangsad.

Biography
Islam was elected as a member of the Pakistan National Assembly in 1970. He took part in the Liberation War of Bangladesh. He was elected as a member of the Jatiya Sangsad from Bakerganj-2 in 1973. He was also elected from that constituency in 1979. Later, he was elected as the chairman of Daulatkhan Upazila Parishad in 1986.

Islam died on 28 November 2012 at a hospital in Dhaka at the age of 70.

References

1940s births
2012 deaths
People from Bhola District
1st Jatiya Sangsad members
2nd Jatiya Sangsad members
Awami League politicians
People of the Bangladesh Liberation War